Chief of Staff is a 2019 South Korean television series starring Lee Jung-jae, Shin Min-a, Lee Elijah, Kim Dong-jun, Jung Jin-young, Kim Kap-soo, Jung Woong-in, Im Won-hee, Jung Man-sik, Park Hyo-joo and Jo Bok-rae. The first season aired on JTBC from June 14 to July 13, 2019. The second season aired from November 11 to December 10, 2019.

Series overview

Synopsis
The story of politicians and their aides who try to climb up the political ladder.

Cast

Main
 Lee Jung-jae as Jang Tae-joon
 Shin Min-a as Kang Seon-yeong
 Lee Elijah as Yoon Hye-won
 Kim Dong-jun as Han Do-kyeong
 Jung Jin-young as Lee Seong-min (season 1)
 Kim Kap-soo as Song Hee-seop
 Jung Woong-in as Oh Won-sik
 Im Won-hee as Go Seok-man (season 1)
 Jung Man-sik as Choi Kyung-chul (season 2)
 Park Hyo-joo as Lee Ji-eun (season 2)
 Jo Bok-rae as Young Jong-yeol (season 2)

Supporting
 Kim Hong-pa as Jo Gap-yeong
 Lee Chul-min as Kim Hyung-do
 Ko In-beom as Seong Yeong-gi
 Yoo Sung-joo as Lee Chang-jin
 Jeon Jin-ki as Lee Gwi-dong
 Jun Seung-bin as Kim Jong-wook
 Do Eun-bi as No Da-jeong
 Park Myung-shin as Yeo Sook-hee
 Kim Seo-ha as Lee In-soo
 Kim Ik-tae as Lee Sang-gook
 Nam Sung-jin as Ahn Hyeon-min
 Park Geon as Seo Hyung-chul
 Lee Sun-won as Lee Hyung-sa
 Yoo Ha-bok as Park Jong-gil
 Ji So-yeon as Kim Mi-jin
 Lee Yong-yi as Yu’s grandmother

Special appearances

Season 1
 Kim Eung-soo as Jang Choon-bae (Ep. 1, 7)
 Lee Soon-won as Detective Lee Hyeong-bae (Ep. 1, 3, 8-9)
 Cha Sun-bae as Minister of Justice (Ep. 2-4)
 Jang Jae-ho as reporter Sung Woo (Ep. 2)
 Lee Joon-hee member of Jo Gap-young's party (Ep. 2)
 Lee Han-wi as Chief Presidential Secretary (Ep. 4-5, 7)
 Lee Yong-yi as merchant Ok Ja (Ep. 5-6, 10)
 Go In-bum as chairman Sung Young-gi (Ep. 8)
 Lee Jong-goo as barber (Ep. 9)
 Seo Wang-seok as detective (Ep. 9)

Season 2
 Go In-bum as chairman Sung Young-gi
 Kim Eung-soo as Jang Choon-bae (Ep. 2–4)
 Park Myung-shin as Yeo Sook-hee
 Kim Ik-tae as Lee Sang-guk (Ep. 1, 5)
 Lee Soon-won as Detective Lee Hyeong-bae (Ep. 3, 5)
 Jang Jae-ho as reporter Sung Woo
 Lee Joon-hee member of Jo Gap-young's party (Ep. 1)
 Lee Yong-yi as merchant Ok Ja (Ep. 3–4)
 Lee Han-wi as Chief Presidential Secretary (Ep. 5)
 Park Ji-yoon (Ep. 4)
 Jung Myung-joon as prosecutor Sim
 Lee Min-ji
 Hong Seo-joon (Ep. 2)
 Choi Jung-woo
 Jung Dong-gyu (Ep. 6)
 Park Geon as prosecutor (Ep. 1, 5)
 Ok Joo-ri (Ep. 5)
 Ma Si-hwan as prosecutor Yoon
 Sung Ian as reporter
 Sung Dong-il (Ep. 10)

Production
 The first script reading took place on March 26, 2019 in Nonhyeon-dong, Seoul, South Korea.
 The series is Lee Jung-jae's small-screen comeback after ten years.

Original soundtrack

Season 1

Part 1

Part 2

Season 2

Part 1

Part 2

Part 3

Chart performance

Viewership

Awards and nominations

References

External links
  
 
 

JTBC television dramas
2019 South Korean television series debuts
South Korean political television series
2019 South Korean television series endings
Television series by Next Entertainment World
Korean-language Netflix exclusive international distribution programming